W. S. "Lob" or "Lobster" Brown was a college football player.

Georgia Tech
Brown was a prominent tackle for the Georgia Tech Golden Tornado of the Georgia Institute of Technology. He came from Chattanooga, Tennessee. He was elected to the Georgia Tech Athletics Hall of Fame in 1966.

1904
Brown was selected All-Southern in 1904. Some publications claim he was Tech's first All-Southern player; others list Jesse Thrash.

1906
He also kicked, responsible for the win over Davidson by a field goal. Brown also helped Tech to its first defeat over Auburn in 1906. He was captain-elect of 1907.

References

American football tackles
Georgia Tech Yellow Jackets football players
All-Southern college football players
American football placekickers
Sportspeople from Chattanooga, Tennessee